Sword of Blood and Valour is a 1958/1959 two-part Hong Kong film based on Louis Cha's novel Sword Stained with Royal Blood.

Cast
 Note: Some of the characters' names are in Cantonese romanisation.

 Cho Tat-wah as Yuen Sing-chi
 Shek Sau as young Yuen Sing-chi
 Sheung-koon Kwan-wai as Wan Ching-ching
 Chan Tsui-ping as Ah-kau (part 2)
 Tsi Law-Lin as Ah-kau (part 1) / Kiu Yuen-yee (part 2)
 Ng Cho-fan as Ha Suet-yee
 Law Yim-hing as Wan Yee
 Shih Kien as Wan Ming-san (part 1) / Man Tsi-wah (part 2)
 Ng Yan-chi as Wan Ming-yee (part 1) / Mui Kim-wo (part 2)
 Chow Siu-loi as Wan Ming-see
 Chan Yiu-lam as Wan Ming-wu
 Siu Hon-sang as Wan Ming-tat
 Ho San as Wan Cheng (part 1) / Wong Tit (part 2)
 Lee Yuet-ching as Sixth Aunt Wan (part 1) / Mrs Kiu (part 2)
 Chan Ho-Kau as On Siu-wai
 Wong Oi-ming as young On Siu-wai
 Chan Wai-yu as On Tai-neung (part 1) / Suen Chung-kwan (part 2)
 Ling Mung as Taoist Muk-song
 Yeung Yip-wang as Muk Yan-ching
 Yuen Siu-tien as Mute
 Ko Chiu as Wing Choi
 Ko Lo-chuen as Lung Tak-lam
 Lee Ching as Kiu Kung-lai
 Mak Sin-shing as Ng Ping
 Yeung Fan as Law Lap-yu
 Wong Chor-san as Ching Ching-chuk

External links

1958 films
1959 films
Films based on works by Jin Yong
Works based on Sword Stained with Royal Blood
Wuxia films
Films set in 17th-century Ming dynasty
Hong Kong martial arts films